Friederike Engel is a German football defender, currently playing for Hamburger SV in the Frauen Bundesliga. She has also played for American Eagles in the NCAA.

As an Under-19 international she won the 2006 U-19 European Championship.

References

1987 births
Living people
German women's footballers
German expatriate women's footballers
Expatriate women's soccer players in the United States
Women's association football defenders
Women's association football midfielders
Footballers from Hamburg